Durban Ladies is a South African women's association football club.

The club won SASOL League and gained a spot in SAFA Women's League that's started in August 2019. The league didn't finished due to COVID-19 which resulted Mamelodi Sundowns Ladies FC to be crownd the champions.

Durban Ladies player, Zamandosi Cele represented the country at the 2012 London Olympics.

History

This club founded by Mary–Jane Sokhela in 1990. The club was founded under the name of Umlazi Fast Eagles. In 1997 was sponsored by Spar and AmaZulu and later changed the club's name to Spar AmaZulu Ladies FC. In 1999, it was changed again to Durban Ladies FC

Players

See also
• Mamelodi Sundowns ladies• JVW FC

References

Women's soccer clubs in South Africa
Association football clubs established in 1990
Soccer clubs in Durban
1990 establishments in South Africa